Kısıklı is a village in the Yüksekova District of Hakkâri Province in Turkey. The village is populated by Kurds of the Dirî tribe and had a population of 1,221 in 2022.

The  hamlets of Aşağıgüveç,  Dereiçi and Sualtı are attached to the village.

Population 
Population history from 2000 to 2022:

References 

Villages in Yüksekova District
Kurdish settlements in Hakkâri Province